Bloodfist VIII: Trained to Kill (though later released as Bloodfist VIII: Hard Way Out) is a 1996 American action film directed by Rick Jacobson and starring Don "The Dragon" Wilson, John Patrick White, Jillian McWhirter, and Warren Burton. It was written by Alex Simon. It is the Final Bloodfist movie in name only to star Don "The Dragon" Wilson

External links

1996 films
1990s action films
American martial arts films
American action films
Kickboxing films
Direct-to-video sequel films
American sequel films
1996 martial arts films
Bloodfist films
English-language Irish films
1990s English-language films
Films directed by Rick Jacobson
1990s American films